Three warships of Japan have been named Mogami, after the Mogami River in the Tohoku region of Honshū:

 , a  heavy cruiser that commissioned in 1935 and scuttled in 1944 after the Battle of the Surigao Strait.
 , an  launched in 1961 and stricken in 1991.
 , a  launched in 2021.

Imperial Japanese Navy ship names
Japanese Navy ship names